The London and North Eastern Railway (LNER) Class J39 was a class of medium powered 0-6-0 steam locomotive designed for mixed-traffic work throughout the former LNER system between London and the north of Scotland.

History
The class was introduced by Nigel Gresley in July 1926, based on his previous Class J38 (introduced in January 1926) but with larger driving wheels. The larger wheels enabled them to be used on both passenger and freight trains, although at the expense of a lower tractive effort. As a result they were given the BR power classification 4P/5F, rather than the 6F of the earlier class. A total of 289 examples were built over the next fifteen years, mostly built by the LNER's Darlington Works although 28 were built by Beyer, Peacock and Co. in 1935.

The larger wheels necessitated the provision of low splashers over the front two wheels, which is the main means of differentiating between the two classes. However the increased speed afforded by the larger wheels caused the big end bearings to overheat, something that was aggravated by their use on passenger trains, and reliability suffered as a result. The locomotives were all fitted with superheaters and Ross 'Pop' safety valves.

All passed into British Railways ownership in 1948 and they were numbered 64700-64988. They began to be withdrawn from service in 1959 and all examples had been scrapped by the end of 1962. No. 64747 served out the remainder of its days as a stationary boiler at the Woodford shed until October of 1964.

Sub-classes

The class was divided into three sub-classes depending on the type of tender fitted.
 J39/1 Standard LNER 3500 gallon tender.
 J39/2 Standard LNER 4200 gallon tender.
 J39/3 Various former North Eastern Railway tenders 3940-4125 gallons.

Accidents and incidents
Circa 1930, locomotive No. 1448 was derailed by trap points at Lumpsey Colliery, Brotton, Yorkshire.
On 28 August 1950, the connecting rod of a locomotive of this class became detached and consequently pierced the firebox, scalding the driver.
On 23 October 1950, locomotive No. 64880 was hauling a passenger train that was derailed at Drumburgh, Cumberland due to the condition of the track. Two people were killed and three were injured.

In model form
Bachmann manufactures the J39/2 version in 00 gauge model form.

Bassett-Lowke manufactures the J39/2 version in 0 gauge model form.

Union Mills manufactures the J39 in British N-Scale.

Graham Farish-Bachmann manufactures the J39 in N scale as BR black with late crest & stepped tender numbered as 64841 and 64880.

References

Citations

References

External links 

 The Gresley J39 0-6-0 Locomotives LNER encyclopedia
 Class J39/1 Details at Rail UK
 Class J39/2 Details at Rail UK
 Class J39/3 Details at Rail UK

J39
0-6-0 locomotives
Railway locomotives introduced in 1926
Scrapped locomotives
Standard gauge steam locomotives of Great Britain